The golden-winged warbler (Vermivora chrysoptera) is a New World warbler. It breeds in southeastern and south-central Canada and in the Appalachian Mountains in northeastern to north-central United States. The majority (~70%) of the global population breeds in Wisconsin, Minnesota, and Manitoba. Golden-winged warbler populations are slowly expanding northwards, but are generally declining across its range, most likely as a result of habitat loss and competition/interbreeding with the very closely related blue-winged warbler, Vermivora cyanoptera. Populations are now restricted to two regions: the Great Lakes and the Appalachian Mountains. The Appalachian population has declined 98% since the 1960s and is significantly imperiled. The U.S. Fish and Wildlife Service has been petitioned to list the species under the Endangered Species Act of 1973 and is currently reviewing all information after issuing a positive finding. Upon review, the U.S. Fish and Wildlife Service found that the petition to list the species as endangered or threatened presents "substantial scientific or commercial information indicating that listing the golden-winged warbler may be warranted."

Etymology

The genus name Vermivora is from Latin vermis "worm", and vorare, "to devour", and the specific  chrysoptera is from Ancient Greek khrusos, "gold", and pteron, "wing".

Description
The male has black throat, black ear patch bordered in white, and a yellow crown and wing patch. Females appear similar to males, with a light gray throat and light gray ear patches. 
In both sexes, extensive white on the tail is conspicuous from below. Underparts are grayish white and the bill is long and slender. Unlike most warblers, juveniles can be reliably sexed (using throat patch color) approximately 15 days after fledging.

Life history

Golden-winged warblers are migratory, breeding in eastern North America and wintering in southern Central America and the neighboring regions in Colombia, Venezuela, and Ecuador. They are very rare vagrants elsewhere.

Golden-winged warblers breed in open scrubby areas, wetlands, and mature forest adjacent to those habitats. They lay 3–6 eggs (often 5) in a concealed cup nest on the ground or low in a bush.

Golden-winged warblers feed on insects, spiders, and caterpillars. They have strong gaping (opening) musculature around their bill, allowing them to uncover hidden caterpillars.

Their song is variable, but is most often perceived as a trilled bzzzzzzz buzz buzz buzz. The call is a buzzy chip or zip.

Male Golden-winged warblers use their brilliant yellow crowns, black throats, and white tail feather patches to signal habitat quality. Birds with more ornate ornaments protect higher quality territories and are typically less aggressive than their less brilliantly-colored conspecifics. However, ornamentation has not been shown to be linked with overall reproductive success. This is likely because golden-winged warblers with less ornamentation likely compensate for this with increased aggression. 

Five geotracked golden-winged warblers in Tennessee were observed migrating hundreds of miles south, presumably avoiding tornadic storms, in April 2014. Individuals left prior to the arrival of the storm, perhaps after detecting it due to infrasound.

Habitat Selection 
Golden-winged warblers are neotropical-nearctic migrants, and their habitat selectivity varies seasonally. Golden-winged warblers wintering in Costa Rica select premontane evergreen forest rather than tropical dry forest plant communities. Golden-winged warblers forage in hanging dead leaves, which are often a result of intermediate disturbances to the forest plant community.

During the breeding season, golden-winged warblers nest in shrubland and regenerating forest communities created and maintained by disturbance. This dependency on early-successional plant communities is part of the reason golden-winged warbler populations are declining.

Hybridization

This species forms two distinctive hybrids with blue-winged warblers where their ranges overlap in the Great Lakes and New England area. The more common, genetically dominant Brewster's warbler is gray above and whitish (male) or yellow (female) below. It has a black eyestripe and two white wingbars.

The rarer recessive Lawrence's warbler has a male plumage with green and yellow above and yellow below, with white wing bars and the same face pattern as male golden-winged. The female is gray above and whitish below with two yellow wing bars and the same face pattern as female golden-winged. Another rare recessive hybrid form is Burket's warbler, which has been noted in the same geographic area as Brewster's and Lawrence's. Burket's warbler was first documented by researchers at Cornell University's Lab of Ornithology. Brewster's, Lawrence's, and Burket's warblers can vary considerably in their physical features and sing songs of either blue-winged or golden-winged warblers. The colour of the throat patch reliably correlates with hybrid type, but colour of the underparts is highly variable between different hybrids.

Genetic introgression occurs across their range, producing cryptic hybrids (morphologically pure individuals with small amounts of blue-winged warbler DNA). These hybrids may be present in low numbers even on the edges of golden-winged warbler range, far from any populations of blue-winged warblers.

Hybridization between golden-winged warblers and blue-winged warblers is likely occurring at a much higher rate than initially thought. Genetic analysis has allowed scientists to more accurately quantify extra-pair copulation, and one study showed EPC was occurring in 55% of golden-winged warbler nests, resulting in phenotypic golden-winged warblers that were actually hybrids. Traditional indicators of the hybrid status of an individual, such as colouration of the underparts, are also

Interspecific interactions 
In 2015, scientists observed a strange event. A female golden-winged warbler abandoned her two fledgling chicks 5 and 9 days after fledging. The two chicks were subsequently "adopted" by a male black-and-white warbler, which fed the fledglings for 23 days until they reached independence.

References

External links

Golden-winged warbler - Vermivora chrysoptera - USGS Patuxent Bird Identification InfoCenter
Golden-winged warbler species account - Cornell Lab of Ornithology
 
 

golden-winged warbler
Native birds of the Northeastern United States
Birds of the Dominican Republic
Birds of the Caribbean
Birds of Appalachia (United States)
golden-winged warbler
golden-winged warbler